The 2009 Miller Superbike World Championship round was the seventh round of the 2009 Superbike World Championship season. It took place on the weekend of May 29–31, 2009 at Miller Motorsports Park in Tooele, Utah.

Results

Superbike race 1
Race 1 was stopped after lap 7 for a crash involving Karl Muggeridge. The race was then restarted and completed; the final standings are the aggregate of the times of the two heats.

Superbike race 2

Supersport race

References
 Superbike Race 1 (Archived 2009-07-31)
 Superbike Race 2
 Supersport Race

External links
 The official website of the Miller Motorsports Park
 The official website of the Superbike World Championship

Miller Round
Miller
Miller Superbike World Championship round